10,000 Small Businesses is a philanthropic initiative launched by Goldman Sachs and the Goldman Sachs Foundation in November 2009 that pledges $500 million in various aid to small businesses in the United States, United Kingdom, and France.  The initiative aims to provide 10,000 small businesses with assistance – ranging from business and management education and mentoring to access to capital and business support services. Goldman Sachs' CEO Lloyd Blankfein, Berkshire Hathaway's Warren Buffett and Harvard Business School professor Michael Porter are the chairs of the program's advisory council. The program was launched in the face of mounting criticism over Goldman Sachs' large bonus payouts after repaying (with interest) $10 billion in TARP funds it received from the U.S. Treasury. According to the company, the small business initiative had been in development a year before the initial launch, and is modeled after its 10,000 Women Initiative, which has helped educate female entrepreneurs in 43 countries.
According to a January 2013 report by Babson College, 63.7% of program participants in the United States reported an increase in revenue and 44.8% added new jobs following graduation.

Program Overview
Under the plan, Goldman will provide $200 million to pay for small-business owners to get business and management education at local community colleges – the first program being at LaGuardia Community College in Queens, New York. Additionally, the program allocates $300 million in loans and grants to small businesses.

As of September 2013, small business owners in all 50 states can apply to the program through an online curriculum or at one of 13 community college sites. Networking and mentoring will be offered through partnerships with national and local business organizations, as well as employees of Goldman Sachs.

Additionally, in 2010 Goldman Sachs launched 10,000 Small Businesses UK which is offered in Yorkshire, the North West, the Midlands and London and its partners include Saïd Business School (University of Oxford), Leeds University Business School, Manchester Metropolitan University Business School, Aston Business School and University College London (UCL).

Selection criteria
The plan targets companies employing at least four full-time employees and with revenue of at least $150,000 in the most recent fiscal year. Eligible companies have to have been operating for at least two years and work "predominantly in under served markets."

Partners
The partner institutions and organizations include establishments in both academia and nonprofit sectors, as well as mission driven capital lenders.

Social media
In February 2014 the Twitter handle @GS10KSmallBiz was launched by Goldman Sachs. In December 2015 the account had over 18,000 followers. Profiles of the 10,000 Small Businesses graduates can be viewed on the Goldman Sachs YouTube playlist titled: Meet the Owners: 10,000 Small Businesses in the US.

See also

College partners
 American Association of Community Colleges
 Association of Community College Trustees
 Babson College
 City Colleges of Chicago
 Community College of Philadelphia
 Cuyahoga Community College
 Delgado Community College
 Oakland Community College
 Houston Community College
 Lagos Business School
 LaGuardia Community College
 Long Beach City College
 Los Angeles City College
 Miami Dade College
 Macomb Community College
 Wayne State University

Nonprofit partners
 Initiative for a Competitive Inner City
 National Federation of Independent Business
 National Urban League
 United States Hispanic Chamber of Commerce
 Greater Philadelphia Hispanic Chamber of Commerce

See also
10,000 Women

References

External links
 10,000 Small Businesses Website
 Video 10,000 Small Businesses
 Daily News Article

Goldman Sachs